Calbera or Calvera is a locality located in the municipality of Beranuy, in Huesca province, Aragon, Spain. As of 2020, it has a population of 16.

Geography 
Calbera is located 128km east-northeast of Huesca.

References

Populated places in the Province of Huesca